Vegas de Matter is a municipality located in the province of Segovia, Castile and León, Spain. According to the 2021 census (INE), the municipality has a population of 313 inhabitants.

References 

Municipalities in the Province of Segovia